Tistrella mobilis is a  Gram-negative, strictly aerobic, rod-shaped and highly motile bacterium from the genus of Tistrella which has been isolated from wastewater in Thailand. Tistrella mobilis produces didemnins.

References

External links
Type strain of Tistrella mobilis at BacDive -  the Bacterial Diversity Metadatabase

Rhodospirillales
Bacteria described in 2003